The Jersey Shore BlueClaws (formerly Lakewood BlueClaws) are a Minor League Baseball team of the South Atlantic League and the High-A affiliate of the Philadelphia Phillies. They are located in Lakewood, New Jersey, and are named for their location on the Jersey Shore and blue crabs native to the area. The BlueClaws play their home games at ShoreTown Ballpark.

History
Following the 2000 season, the Cape Fear Crocs of the Class A South Atlantic League relocated to Lakewood, New Jersey, and became the Lakewood BlueClaws. The BlueClaws became an affiliate of the Philadelphia Phillies, who moved their Class A affiliation from the Piedmont Boll Weevils in Kannapolis, North Carolina, to Lakewood beginning with the 2001 season. The team was owned by the New-Jersey-born Joe Plumeri and Joe Finley, also owners of the Trenton Thunder.

Since their arrival in New Jersey, the BlueClaws have been a success at the gate. In each of their first five seasons, they averaged over 6,500 people per game. The team led the South Atlantic League in either average or total attendance every year through 2016, and became the fastest team in league history to reach the two and three million fan attendance mark. On August 26, 2002, the BlueClaws set a South Atlantic League record when 13,003 people attended a 3–0 win over the Hickory Crawdads. This box office success comes in the absence of great success on the field. In their first five seasons, the BlueClaws failed to qualify for the playoffs. Their overall record topped the .500 mark for the first time in 2004.

On September 1, 2004, Ryan Howard became the first former BlueClaw to play in Major League Baseball, playing first base for the Phillies in a 7–2 loss to the Atlanta Braves at Citizens Bank Park. He played for the BlueClaws in the 2002 season. In 2005, he was named the National League Rookie of the Year, and in 2006 he was named the National League Most Valuable Player. In May 2007, while on the 15-day disabled list, Howard played two rehab games with the BlueClaws after suffering a hamstring injury. Each game drew over 8,000 fans and helped push the BlueClaws to a new team attendance record for the month of May. In addition to Howard, several former BlueClaws played for the 2008 World Champion Philadelphia Phillies. World Series MVP Cole Hamels was with Lakewood in 2003, and starting catcher Carlos Ruiz was a member of the original Lakewood BlueClaws' roster in 2001.

The BlueClaws were sold to Shore Town Baseball in July 2017. The new ownership group includes Minor League Baseball veteran and former Mandalay Baseball Properties CEO Art Matin, as well as local investors Bob Tamashunas and Bill Luby.

The team rebranded as the Jersey Shore BlueClaws after the 2020 season. In conjunction with Major League Baseball's restructuring of Minor League Baseball in 2021, the BlueClaws were organized into the High-A East. In 2022, the High-A East became known as the South Atlantic League, the name historically used by the regional circuit prior to the 2021 reorganization.

Season-by-season records

Postseason records
The BlueClaws won the 2006 South Atlantic League championship on September 15, first defeating the Lexington Legends in the Northern Division final, two games to none, then defeating the Augusta GreenJackets in a dramatic 5–0 victory, winning the championship series, three games to one.

In 2009, the BlueClaws won the South Atlantic League championship by first defeating the Kannapolis Intimidators, 9–0, and winning the series by two games to none in the Northern Division final. In the championship round, the BlueClaws defeated the Greenville Drive, 5–1, in game four and then took the series, three games to one.

In 2010, the BlueClaws won both halves of the season. They became the first team to do so and win the championship, defeating Hickory, two games to one, in the Northern Division final and the Greenville Drive, three games to one, in a rematch series.

In 2016, the BlueClaws opened the first half of the season in sixth place in the Northern Division but rallied to take the second half crown. The BlueClaws then defeated the Hagerstown Suns, two games to zero, but fell in the South Atlantic League final series, three games to one, versus the Rome Braves.

Roster

Retired numbers
Cole Hamels' number 19 and Ryan Howard's number 29 have been retired by the BlueClaws.

Notable alumni

 Ezequiel Astacio
 Rod Barajas (2007)
 Danny Bautista (1991–1992) 
 Michael Bourn (2004) 2-time MLB All-Star
 Milton Bradley (1998) MLB All-Star
 Eude Brito (2001)
 Taylor Buchholz (2002)
 Carlos Carrasco
 Frank Catalanotto (1994)
 Francisco Cordero (1995–1996) 3-time MLB All-Star
 Kyle Drabek
 Juan Encarnacion (1994–1995)
 Gavin Floyd (2002)
 Travis Fryman (1998) 5-time MLB All-Star
 Greg Golson MLB All-Star
 Cole Hamels (2003, 2006) 4-time MLB All-Star; 2008 World Series Most Valuable Player
 J. A. Happ (2005) 
 Ryan Howard (2002, 2007, 2010) 3-time MLB All-Star; 2005 NL Rookie of the Year; 2006 NL Most Valuable Player
 Gabe Kapler (1996) 2021 National League Manager of the Year
 Kyle Kendrick (2004, 2006)
 Scott Kingery (born 1994)
 Cliff Lee (2000) 4-time MLB All-Star; 2008 AL Cy Young Award
 Scott Mathieson
 Lou Marson
 Guillermo Mota (1996)
 Brandon Phillips (2002) 3-time MLB All-Star
 Chris Roberson
 Carlos Ruiz (2001) MLB All-Star
 Alfredo Simon (2003) MLB All-Star
 Scott Strickland (1996, 1998)
 Justin Thompson (1992, 1996) MLB All-Star
 Robinson Tejeda
 Shane Victorino (2007) 2-time MLB All-Star
Luke Williams
 Randy Wolf (2006) MLB All-Star
 Tim Worrell (2005) 
 Mike Zagurski
 Josh Zeid (2010)

References

External links

 
 Statistics from Baseball-Reference

 
Philadelphia Phillies minor league affiliates
South Atlantic League teams
Professional baseball teams in New Jersey
Ocean County, New Jersey
Baseball teams established in 2001
2001 establishments in New Jersey
High-A East teams